A list of windmills in Devon.

Locations

Sources

Unless stated otherwise, the source for all entries is

Maps

1675 John Ogilby
1765 Benjamin Donn
1809 Ordnance Survey
1827 C & J Greenwood

Notes

Mills in bold are still standing, known building dates are indicated in bold. Text in italics denotes indicates that the information is not confirmed, but is likely to be the case stated.

References

Devon
Windmills